Robert Joseph "Bob" Fisher (born August 26, 1954) is an American businessman. He is currently chairman of The Gap, Inc. and has been a director since 1990; he was previously chairman of the board (2004-2007) and interim chief executive officer. The son of Gap Inc. co-founders Donald Fisher and Doris F. Fisher, Bob Fisher has been involved with the company as a board member or employee for over 30 years.

Early life and education
Fisher was born to a Jewish family, is the son of Doris Feigenbaum Fisher and Donald Fisher, the co-founders of Gap, Inc. He has two brothers: William S. Fisher and John J. Fisher. Fisher attended Phillips Exeter Academy and Princeton University, where he received a bachelor's degree.  He is also a graduate of the Stanford University School of Business, from which he earned a Master of Business Administration.

Career
Fisher's professional history with the company began when he became a Gap store manager in 1980. Following that, Fisher went to work at the company's corporate headquarters, where his roles increased in responsibility, with hands-on experience as a merchant and executive.

In 1989, Fisher was named President of Banana Republic. In 1990, he became a member of the Board of Directors of Gap Inc., and in 1992, he was named an Executive Vice President of Gap Inc. From 1993 to 1995, he served as Chief Financial Officer of Gap Inc., at which time he was promoted to Chief Operating Officer of the company. In 1997, he was named President of Gap brand, overseeing the adult, babyGap and GapKids businesses. In 2004, he served as chairman of the board of directors.

In November 2019, Fisher replaced Art Peck of Gap Inc, as interim chief executive officer.

Philanthropy
He is chair of the board of the San Francisco Museum of Modern Art.

Environmental work
With a longstanding commitment to environmental issues, he serves on the Board of Trustees for Conservation International as a member of the Executive Committee. He served on the board of the Natural Resources Defense Council for more than 20 years, and he is currently on the organization's Honorary Board of Trustees.

In 2009, he was appointed by Governor Arnold Schwarzenegger as the only public member of the Strategic Growth Council, Fisher was appointed by Governor Jerry Brown in 2014 as vice chair.  The SGC coordinates activities that support sustainable communities, emphasizing strong economies, social equity and environmental stewardship.

Political donations

In 2019, it was revealed that Fisher had donated $1 million to a dark money group two months prior to Barack Obama's election in 2012.

Over the past decades, he also has contributed to many Democratic candidates and environmental campaigns

Personal life
He is married to Elizabeth S. Fisher and they have three children. The couple lives in San Francisco.

References

1954 births
Living people
American billionaires
American chairpersons of corporations
American retail chief executives
Businesspeople from the San Francisco Bay Area
Jewish American philanthropists
Princeton University alumni
Stanford Graduate School of Business alumni
Fisher family
Gap Inc. people
21st-century American Jews